The 2014 ATP Challenger Guangzhou was a professional tennis tournament played on hard courts. It was the third edition of the tournament which was part of the 2014 ATP Challenger Tour. It took place in Guangzhou, China between 24 February and 2 March 2014.

ATP entrants

Seeds

 Rankings are as of February 24, 2014.

Other entrants
The following players received wildcards into the singles main draw:
  Gao Xin
  Liu Siyu
  Ouyang Bowen
  Wang Chuhan

The following entrant has been granted entry as a Lucky loser into the main draw:
  Riccardo Ghedin

The following players used Protected Rankings to gain entry into the singles main draw:
  Izak van der Merwe

The following players received entry from the qualifying draw:
  Toshihide Matsui
  Gong Maoxin
  Louk Sorensen
  Michael Venus

Champions

Singles

  Blaž Rola def.  Yūichi Sugita, 6–7(4–7), 6–4, 6–3

Doubles

  Sanchai Ratiwatana /  Sonchat Ratiwatana def.  Lee Hsin-han /  Amir Weintraub, 6–2, 6–4

External links
ITF Search
ATP official site

ATP Challenger Guangzhou
China International Guangzhou
ATP Challenger Guangzhou
ATP Challenger Guangzhou
ATP Challenger Guangzhou